Victor Emmanuel Basa (born June 6, 1985) is a Filipino model, actor, radio V.J., television host and former ex-housemate of Pinoy Big Brother: Celebrity Edition 2.

Victor is the middle child of three, with a younger brother and older sister.

Modeling career
Basa began his modeling career at the age of 19, where he was discovered at the Mega Young Designer's Competition in 2004 by newspaper editor Joyce Fernandez along with fashion designer Kenneth Chua. He joined the Philippine search for the best model of the world where he was awarded best in swimwear, and then landed on a television ad for a cracker, and endorsing a clothing brand, became a television actor then the Cosmopolitan Bachelor's Bash.

In 2005, Basa gained commercial visibility in the Philippines when he became a model for clothing retailer Penshoppe. In 2006, Basa was invited to sign on with Star Magic, the talent management agency affiliated with the ABS-CBN network in the Philippines.

Television career
Soon after signing with Star Magic, Basa quickly began to appear in a number of shows on the ABS-CBN network. He became a regular host of the weekly Sunday variety show ASAP; appeared in his first recurring primetime supporting role in the soap opera Crazy for You as a love interest of the leading lady portrayed by Toni Gonzaga; and landed supporting roles in two single-episode stories in Star Magic Presents.

In 2006, Basa was cast as a regular cast member of Abt Ur Luv, a youth-oriented drama series, as Carla Humphries's love interest. Basa is a member of ABS-CBN's circle of homegrown talents named Star Magic.

In 2007, the new MTV Philippines signed on Basa as one of the channel's new VJs. He currently hosts MTV Timeout.

He was one of the Celebrity Housemates in Pinoy Big Brother: Celebrity Edition 2.

Basa is currently a contract artist of the GMA Network. Basa played a role in the hit drama series My Husband's Lover.

Personal life
In 2010, he dated TV host and real estate heiress Divine Lee. They were together for more than 4 years until their break-up in April 2015.

Victor is featured in The 700 Club Asia where he shared his changed life. He had a realization when he had a friend who committed suicide.

He proposed to his non-showbiz girlfriend Stephanie Dan in September 2019 and got married on November 10 of the same year.

Filmography

Television series

Variety show

Movies
D' Kilabots Pogi Brothers Weh?! (2012)
Pak! Pak! My Dr. Kwak! (2011)
Romeo at Juliet (2010)
Xenoa 2 : Clash of the Bloods (2008)
Maling Akala (2008)

Music videos appearances
Penge Naman Ako Nyan by Itchiworms (2008)
Kasi Naman by Nikki Gil from the Hotsilog Album (2006)
Abot Kamay by Orange and Lemons (2005)

Modeling/ Print
Generation Pink Magazine (August 2006 Cover)
Cosmopolitan Magazine 2006 Centerfold Bachelors

Commercial endorsements and advertisements
Penshoppe advertisements (2005–present)
Oracare
Sunsilk Touchflicks TVC (2006)
Greenwich commercial
Tropicana commercial
Magic Flakes commercial

Awards
Best Model Form—MTV Fashionista 2004
Batti Man of the Year—Chi Chi Man Awards 2007
Mark Van's Hunk—Mark Van Awards 2007

References

External links
Victor Basa Biography on MTV Philippines Vj Site

1985 births
Living people
VJs (media personalities)
Pinoy Big Brother contestants
Filipino male models
Filipino male child actors
Filipino male television actors
Star Magic